Tom Marazzo is a Canadian military veteran, former teacher, and leader in the 2022 Canadian convoy protest.

Career 
Joining in September 1998 in Hamilton, Ontario and working until 2016, Marazzo worked for the Canadian Armed Forces as a military officer. Marazzo reached the rank of captain and worked as a construction engineer. He left the regular forces in 2015, moving to the supplemental reserves. He was never deployed internationally.

Marazzo taught computer software at Georgian College from 2019 until 2021 when he was fired after questioning his the college's COVID-19 vaccine policy.

Marazzo was the Peterborough—Kawartha candidate for the Ontario Party in the 2022 Ontario general election. He alleged that Peterborough mayor Diane Therrien pressured Peterborough police into charging the owners of burger restaurant Peterburgers under city noise bylaws. Marazzo won 1,973 votes, representing 3.8% of the votes cast, losing to Dave Smith of the Progressive Conservative Party.

Activism 
Marazzo was a spokesperson and a leader in the Canada convoy protest, and he helped lead logistics and keep emergency routes on roads open.

During a press conference at the Canada convoy protest, Marazzo suggested that protest organisers could collaborate with the federal opposition parties: the New Democratic Party, the Conservative Party of Canada, and the Bloc Québécois to form a coalition against the government.

On 17 June 2022, fellow protest leader Tamara Lich was arrested for breaching bail conditions that forbade her from meeting Marazzo.

Marazzo is a leader of the Veterans 4 Freedom group.

Emergency Act inquiry 

While being questioned at the public enquiry into the Canadian government use of the Emergencies Act, Marazoo stated that the protest group Diagolon is only an internet meme and not real.

Personal life 
Marazzo previously lived in Barrie, Ontario but moved away after losing his job at Georgian College.

See also 

 Pat King
 Christopher John Barber
 James Bauder

References

External links 
 Marazzo's Twitter

Canadian military officers
Canadian educators
Living people
People from Barrie
Activists from Ontario
Canadian anti-vaccination activists
Year of birth missing (living people)
Protesters involved in the Canada convoy protest